Haras de Jardy was a Thoroughbred horse breeding operation established in 1890 in Marnes-la-Coquette France by the statesman Edmond Blanc (1856-1920). The stud farm became home to many important stallions, including one of the leading sires in France and English Triple Crown Champion Flying Fox, as well as others such as Winkfield's Pride, Val d'Or, Ajax I, Teddy, Hermis and Coaltown.

Haras de Jardy gained such a reputation that it was visited by horse owners and breeders from around the world, including King Edward VII in 1905, Queen Elizabeth II in 1957 and Nikita Khrushchev in 1961. After Edmond Blanc's death in 1920, his wife operated the business. In 1920-21, her horse Ksar scored back-to-back wins in the Prix de l'Arc de Triomphe; ten years later, he was the leading sire in France. 

The property was eventually sold to Marcel Boussac, who owned it until his death in 1980, after which it became the property of the government. Today, it is a public park with a golf course and home to the largest equestrian center in the country.

References
 Official Website and history for Haras de Jardy Equestrian Center (French language)
 Profile of Edmond Blanc (French language)
 Wikipedia page about Haras de Jardy (French language)

1890 establishments in France
Horse farms in France
Parks in France
Sport in Hauts-de-Seine
Organizations established in 1890